Rayan Ghedjemis (also known as Rayane Roumane; born 11 September 2000) is an Algerian tennis player who previously represented France.

His parents, Norsalan and Karima, are both Algerians.

Ghedjemis won Les Petits As in 2014. He has a career high ATP singles ranking of 400 achieved on 30 September 2019. He also has a career high ATP doubles ranking of 805 achieved on 1 July 2019.

Ghedjemis made his ATP main draw debut at the 2019 Moselle Open after receiving a wildcard for the singles main draw.

In May 2022, Ghedjemis changed his name from Rayane Roumane to Rayan Ghedjemis, alongside his nationality from French to Algerian.

References

External links

2000 births
Living people
Algerian male tennis players
French male tennis players